1,039/Smoothed Out Slappy Hours is a compilation album comprising early recordings by American rock band Green Day, released October 1, 1991, on Lookout Records. Often erroneously referred to as the band's debut album, the compilation combines the band's actual debut 39/Smooth and its first two EPs Slappy and 1,000 Hours (all currently out of print), as suggested by the amalgamation of the titles of the debut album and two EPs for the resulting compilation album.  The album includes one cover, "Knowledge" (originally from the 39/Smooth LP), which was originally by influential California punk band Operation Ivy, whose singer, Jesse Michaels, contributed the artwork for the album. The cover art features the same image from 39/Smooth.

Lookout! re-released the album in 2004 with special limited packaging and all-new enhanced CD-ROM features, including live performances and pictures. The album was re-issued in the same packaging in 2007 through Reprise Records after Green Day pulled the album, along with the remainder of the band’s catalog previously released through Lookout!, from the label in August 2005 due to unpaid royalties. Billie Joe took particular pleasure in learning this put Lookout records out of business.

1,039/Smoothed Out Slappy Hours has been certified Gold in the U.S. by the RIAA; according to Nielsen SoundScan, it has sold 632,000 copies in the U.S. as of August 2010. The album was certified Gold in the UK on July 22, 2013, representing sales of at least 100,000 copies. It has sold more than 2 million copies worldwide.

Release
Initially released in 1991 through Lookout! Records (despite the 1990 copyright date on the album), the label re-issued the album in a remastered form in 2004. It was re-released on CD on January 9, 2007, by Reprise Records, the label Green Day has been signed to since leaving Lookout!. In Europe, the album was already re-released by Epitaph Europe, and has remained in print. It was reissued on vinyl on March 24, 2009, by Reprise in a package containing the original 10-song 39/Smooth LP along with reissues of the 1,000 Hours and Slappy EPs. On the 2009 reissues, the song "I Want to Be Alone" is omitted.

Composition
Musically, the record has been labeled as both punk rock and pop-punk.

Reception

Reviews of 1,039/Smoothed Out Slappy Hours were largely mixed; for example, The New Rolling Stone Album Guide gave it 2.5 out of 5 stars. Brad of Punknews.org gave it 3.5 out of 5 stars, writing, "All in all, this album succeeds at being quite good. It shows obvious influences from the Clash and the Ramones, and is a good debut for a young band that would later change the course of Punk Rock forever by opening the floodgates for New School bands."

Track listing

Personnel

Green Day
 Billie Joe Armstrong – lead vocals, guitar
 Mike Dirnt – bass guitar, backing vocals
 John Kiffmeyer – drums, percussion, backing vocals

Additional performers
 Aaron Cometbus – backing vocals, "teeth" on "Knowledge"

Production
 Andy Ernst – producer, engineer
 Green Day – producers
 John Golden – mastering
 Susie Grant – front cover photo
 Jesse Michaels – artwork
 Pat Hynes – artwork, graphic design, layout design
 Chris Appelgren; Aaron Cometbus; Rich Gargano; David Hayes – artwork
 Murray Bowles; Arica Pelino – photography
 Ted Jensen – remastering
 John Yates – packaging

Certification

References

External links

1,039/Smoothed Out Slappy Hours at YouTube (streamed copy where licensed)

Green Day compilation albums
1991 compilation albums
Lookout! Records compilation albums
Reprise Records compilation albums
Epitaph Records compilation albums
Albums produced by Andy Ernst